Evanston Main Street is the southernmost of the three commuter railroad stations in Evanston, Illinois. It is served by Metra's Union Pacific North Line trains, which go south to Ogilvie Transportation Center in Chicago and as far north as Kenosha, Wisconsin. Travel time to Ogilvie is typically 23 minutes, but can be as high as 26 minutes during rush hour. In Metra's zone-based fare system, the station is in zone C. As of 2018, Evanston Main Street is the 41st busiest of Metra's 236 non-downtown stations, with an average of 1,130 weekday boardings. The station does not contain a ticket agent booth; passengers must purchase their tickets on board the train.

As of December 5, 2022, Evanston Main Street is served by 59 trains (30 inbound and 29 outbound) on weekdays, by 12 trains in each direction on Saturdays, and by all nine trains in each direction on Sundays. During the summer concert season, the extra weekend train to  also stops here.

The station is located on Main Street between Chicago Avenue and Custer Avenue, with CTA's Main station immediately to the east. It is one of two Metra stations in Evanston to provide direct transfers to the CTA rail system, the other being the Davis Street station. The neighboring area contains multi-story apartment buildings and the Main Street Station Shopping District.

Main Street station also houses a cultural center known as Evanston Arts Depot, which houses the offices of the Custer's Last Stand festival and has performance space for Piccolo Theatre.

Bus and rail connections
CTA Purple Line
Main

CTA Buses
  206 Evanston Circulator (school days only)  

Pace
  213 Green Bay Road (Monday–Saturday only)

References

External links
Metra—Evanston Main Street
Piccolo Theatre
Custer Fair
Main Street entrance from Google Maps Street View

Metra stations in Illinois
Former Chicago and North Western Railway stations
Main Street (Metra)
Railway stations in the United States opened in 1910
Union Pacific North Line